Konstantinos Kanaris (c. 17901877), also anglicised as Constantine Kanaris or Canaris, was a Greek admiral, Prime Minister, and a hero of the Greek War of Independence.

Biography

Early life
Konstantinos Kanaris was born and grew up on the island of Psara, close to the island of Chios, in the Aegean. The exact year of his birth is unknown. Official records of the Hellenic Navy indicate 1795, however, modern Greek historians consider 1790 or 1793 to be more probable.

He was left an orphan at a young age. Having to support himself, he chose to become a seaman like most members of his family since the beginning of the 18th century. He was subsequently hired as a boy on the brig of his uncle Dimitris Bourekas.

Military career

Kanaris gained his fame during the Greek War of Independence (1821–1829). Unlike most other prominent figures of the War, he had never been initiated into the Filiki Eteria (Society of Friends), which played a significant role in the uprising against the Ottoman Empire, primarily by secret recruitment of supporters against the Turkish rule.

By early 1821, the movement had gained enough support to launch a revolution. This seems to have inspired Kanaris, who was in Odessa at the time. He returned to the island of Psara in haste and was present when it joined the uprising on 10 April 1821.

The island formed its own fleet and the famed seamen of Psara, already known for their well-equipped ships and successful battles against sea pirates, proved to be highly effective in naval warfare. Kanaris soon distinguished himself as a fire ship captain.

At Chios, on the moonless night of 6–7 June 1822, forces under his command destroyed the flagship of Nasuhzade Ali Pasha, Kapudan Pasha (Grand Admiral) of the Ottoman fleet, in revenge for the Chios massacre. The admiral was holding a Bayram celebration, allowing Kanaris and his men to position their fire ship without being noticed. When the flagship's powder store caught fire, all men aboard were instantly killed. The Turkish casualties comprised  men, both naval officers and common sailors, as well as Nasuhzade Ali Pasha himself.

Kanaris led another successful attack against the Ottoman fleet at Tenedos in November 1822. He was famously said to have encouraged himself by murmuring "Konstantí, you are going to die" every time he was approaching a Turkish warship on the fire boat he was about to detonate.

The Ottoman fleet captured Psara on 21 June 1824. A part of the population, including Kanaris, managed to flee the island, but those who didn't were either sold into slavery or slaughtered. After the destruction of his home island, he continued to lead attacks against Turkish forces. In August 1824, he engaged in naval combats in the Dodecanese.

The following year, Kanaris led the Greek raid on Alexandria, a daring attempt to destroy the Egyptian fleet with fire ships that might have been successful if the wind had not failed just after the Greek ships entered Alexandria harbour.

After the end of the War and the independence of Greece, Kanaris became an officer of the new Hellenic Navy, reaching the rank of admiral, and a prominent politician.

Political career
Konstantinos Kanaris was one of the few with the personal confidence of Ioannis Kapodistrias, the first Head of State of independent Greece. After the assassination of Kapodistrias on 9 October 1831, he retired to the island of Syros.

During the reign of King Otto I, Kanaris served as Minister in various governments and then as Prime Minister in the provisional government (16 February30 March 1844). He served a second term (15 October 184812 December 1849), and as Navy Minister in the 1854 cabinet of Alexandros Mavrokordatos.

In 1862, he was among the rare War of Independence veterans who took part in the bloodless insurrection that deposed the increasingly unpopular King Otto I and led to the election of Prince William of Denmark as King George I of Greece. During his reign, Kanaris served as a Prime Minister for a third term (6 March16 April 1864), fourth term (26 July 186426 February 1865) and fifth and last term (7 June2 September 1877).

Kanaris died on 2 September 1877 whilst still serving in office as Prime Minister. Following his death his government remained in power until 14 September 1877 without agreeing on a replacement at its head. He was buried in the First Cemetery of Athens and his heart was placed in a silver urn.

Legacy
Konstantinos Kanaris is considered a national hero in Greece and ranks amongst the most notable participants of the War of Independence. Many statues and busts have been erected in his honour, such as Kanaris a Scio in Palermo, Italy. He was also featured on a Greek ₯1 coin and a ₯100 banknote issued by the Bank of Greece.

To honour Kanaris, the following ships of the Hellenic Navy have been named after him:

 Kanaris, a gunboat commissioned in 1835
 Kanaris, a torpedo boat tender commissioned in 1880
 , a Hunt-class destroyer commissioned in 1942
 , a  commissioned in 1972
 , an  commissioned in 2002

Te Korowhakaunu / Kanáris Sound, a section of Taiari / Chalky Inlet in New Zealand's Fiordland National Park, was named after Konstantinos Kanaris by French navigator and explorer Jules de Blosseville (1802–1833).

Family
In 1817, Konstantinos Kanaris married Despoina Maniatis, from a historical family of Psara.

They had seven children:

 Nikolaos Kanaris (1818–1848), killed during a military expedition in Beirut
 Themistoklis Kanaris (1819–1851), killed during a military expedition in Egypt
 Thrasyvoulos Kanaris (1820–1898), admiral
 Miltiadis Kanaris (1822–1901), admiral, member of the Greek Parliament for many years, Naval Minister three times in 1864, 1871, and 1878
 Lykourgos Kanaris (1826–1865), naval officer and lawyer
 Maria Kanaris (1828–1847), married A. Balabano
 Aristeidis Kanaris (1831–1863), officer killed in the uprising of 1863

Wilhelm Canaris, a German Admiral, speculated that he might be a descendant of Konstantinos Kanaris. An official genealogical family history that was researched in 1938 showed however, that he was of Italian descent and not related to the Kanaris family from Greece.

Honours

Greek honours
  Order of the Redeemer (Kingdom of Greece): Grand Cross, 1864

Foreign honours
  Royal Guelphic Order (Kingdom of Hanover): Grand Cross
  Order of the Dannebrog (Kingdom of Denmark): Grand Cross

See also
 List of prime ministers of Greece
 Greek War of Independence
 Kanaris family
 Hellenic Navy
 History of Greece
 Greek ship Kanaris
 First Cemetery of Athens

References

Works cited

External links
 A concise history of the Grand Lodge of Greece and the origins of the Philiki Etairia
 Biography of Konstantinos Kanaris on Rulers.org
 Statue of Konstantinos Kanaris on Chios island, Greece
 Major figures of the Greek War of Independence
 Modern Egypt under Mohammad Ali, Viceroy of Egypt

|-

|-

|-

|-

1790 births
1877 deaths
Konstantinos
18th-century Greek people
19th-century prime ministers of Greece
Ministers of Naval Affairs of Greece
People from Psara
Hellenic Navy admirals
Greek people of the Greek War of Independence
Prime Ministers of Greece
Burials at the First Cemetery of Athens
Grand Crosses of the Order of the Dannebrog
Russian Party politicians